Franprix is a grocery store chain of the Groupe Casino, headquartered in Paris.

History

References

See also

External links
 Franprix 

Groupe Casino
Retail companies of France
Retail companies established in 1958
French companies established in 1958
French brands